Leon Abramson, known as Lee Abrams (January 6, 1925 – April 20, 1992) was an American jazz drummer.

Early life
Abrams was born in New York City and was raised in Brooklyn. His father played the violin and clarinet. His brother, Ray Abrams, was a jazz saxophonist.

Career 
Abramson joined the United States Army in 1943 and was discharged in 1946. During his career, Abramson played with Roy Eldridge. On 52nd Street, he played with Coleman Hawkins, Eddie Lockjaw Davis and Jay Jay Johnson.

References

American jazz drummers
1925 births
1992 deaths
Musicians from Brooklyn
United States Army soldiers
United States Army personnel of World War II
Jazz musicians from New York (state)